Cea or CEA may refer to:

Businesses 
 Cambridge Environmental Assessments, a company specializing in chemical risk assessment
 CEA Technologies, an Australian defence contractor
 China Eastern Airlines, based in Shanghai, People's Republic of China

Government bodies or offices 
 Central Electricity Authority, in charge of the electricity supply industry in England and Wales between 1954 and 1957
 Central Electricity Authority (India), an advisory organization to the Indian government
 Chief Economic Adviser to the Government of India
 China Earthquake Administration or Chinese Seismic Bureau
  (European Collectivity of Alsace), a territorial collectivity of France resulting from the merger of two former departments
 Council for Estate Agencies, a statutory board under the Ministry of National Development of Singapore
 Council of Economic Advisers, an agency within the Executive Office of the President of the United States

Legislation 
 Canada Elections Act
 Canada Evidence Act, an 1893 act of the Parliament of Canada that regulates the rules of evidence
 Chinese Exclusion Act, an 1882 law in the United States, barring the immigration of Chinese citizens
 Commodity Exchange Act, a piece of legislation regulating the sale of commodities in the United States

Medicine 
 Carcinoembryonic antigen, a tumor marker for colorectal cancer
 Carotid endarterectomy, a surgical procedure involving the carotid artery
 Central nucleus of the amygdala
 Collie eye anomaly, a congenital eye disease in dogs

Organizations 
 California Earthquake Authority, a privately funded, publicly managed organization that sells California earthquake insurance policies
 Canadian Economics Association, an academic association of Canadian economists
 Compulsive Eaters Anonymous, 12-Step Program for Compulsive Eaters
 Cheer Extreme All Stars, a cheerleading organization based in North Carolina
 Christian Evangelistic Assemblies, a Christian organization supporting non-denominational churches
 Cinema Exhibitors' Association, the national trade association for cinema operators in the United Kingdom
 Colorado Education Association, a federation of labor unions
  or Insurance Europe, an organization representing the European insurance and reinsurance industry
  or French Alternative Energies and Atomic Energy Commission, a government-funded research organisation
 Commission on English Language Accreditation: Commission on English Language Program Accreditation, an American NGO accrediting English  programs worldwide
 Consumer Electronics Association or Consumer Technology Association, a trade organization for the American consumer electronics industry
 Connecticut Education Association, a professional organization advocating for teachers and public school students
 Correctional Education Association, a non-profit professional association providing educational services in correctional settings

Places 
 Kos or Cea, an Aegean island of Greece 
 Cea (river), a river in Spain 
 Cea, León, a municipality in Spain

Schools 
  or Centre for American Studies, an academic institution in Havana, Cuba
 , an arts institute in Mexico City
 College of Engineering, Adoor, an engineering college at Adoor, Kerala

Other uses 
 Cea (surname)
 Carcinoembryonic antigen, a protein found in the blood as a marker for some types of cancer
 Certified Audio Engineer, a professional title regulated by the Society of Broadcast Engineers
 Communications-enabled application, a software application that depends on real-time networking capabilities
 Controlled-environment agriculture, a technology-based approach toward food production
 Cost-effectiveness analysis, an economic analysis sometimes used to evaluate medical treatments
 Cessna Aircraft Field's IATA airport code and FAA location identifier
 Cylindrical equal-area projection
 Lower Chehalis language's ISO 639-3 code

People with the given name
 Cea Sunrise Person (born 1969), Canadian writer and former model